The ACM Doctoral Dissertation Award is awarded annually by the Association for Computing Machinery to the authors of the best doctoral dissertations in computer science and computer engineering. The award is accompanied by a prize of US $20,000 and winning dissertations are published in the ACM Digital Library. Honorable mentions are awarded $10,000. Financial support is provided by Google. The number of awarded dissertations may vary year-to-year.

ACM also awards the ACM India Doctoral Dissertation Award. Several Special Interest Groups (SIGs) award a Doctoral Dissertation Award.

Recipients

See also

 List of computer science awards
 List of engineering awards

References

External links
ACM Doctoral Dissertation Award Winners on acm.org
ACM Doctoral Dissertation Awards with affiliations

Theoretical computer science
Computer science awards